Walter Durbano (born 31 May 1963) is a former Italian male long-distance runner who competed at two editions of the IAAF World Cross Country Championships at senior level (1990, 1994).

References

External links
 

1963 births
Living people
Italian male long-distance runners
Italian male marathon runners
Italian male cross country runners